John de Pageham (or John of Pageham) was a medieval Bishop of Worcester.

Life

John was a clerk of Theobald of Bec, Archbishop of Canterbury before he was selected to become bishop. He was ordained a priest on 3 March 1151. He was consecrated on 4 March 1151. He died in 1157, possibly in December.

Citations

References

 Barlow, Frank Thomas Becket Berkeley, CA:University of California Press 1986 
 British History Online Bishops of Worcester accessed on 3 November 2007
 

Bishops of Worcester
12th-century English Roman Catholic bishops
1157 deaths
Year of birth unknown